Just Out Of Reach is an album by pop singer Perry Como released by RCA Records in 1975.

Track listing
 "Let's Do It Again" (Tony Hatch, Jackie Trent) - 2:59
 "Then You Can Tell Me Goodbye" (John D. Loudermilk) - 2:40
 "Here, There and Everywhere" (John Lennon, Paul McCartney) - 2:41
 "Let It Be Love" (Ben Peters) - 2:35
 "The Grass Keeps Right On Growin'" (Gloria Shayne) - 3:11
 "Just Out of Reach" (Virgil F. Stewart) - 2:45
 "Let Me Call You Baby Tonight" (Porter Jordan, Bob Duncan) - 2:28
 "Loving Her Was Easier" (Kris Kristofferson) - 3:10
 "Make Love to Life" (James Stein) - 2:54
 "Love Put a Song in My Heart" (Ben Peters) - 2:50

References

External links
Perry Como Discography

Perry Como albums
1975 albums
Albums produced by Chet Atkins
RCA Records albums